was a feudal domain of the Edo period Tokugawa shogunate located in  Mikawa Province (modern-day Aichi Prefecture), Japan, what is now part of the modern-day cities of Kariya and Anjō. It was centered on Kariya Castle, which was located in what is now the city of Kariya.

History
During the Sengoku period, the area of Kariya Domain was part of the territory of Tokugawa Ieyasu’s mother’s family, the Mizuno clan. Ieyasu’s maternal grandfather Mizuno Tadamasa built Kariya Castle. The Mizuno clan shifted allegiances adroitly between the Imagawa clan to Oda Nobunaga and to Toyotomi Hideyoshi, who relocated the clan to Ise Province. However, Mizuno Katsunari, the grandson of Tadamasa was allowed to return to the clan’s ancestral territories by Ieyasu after the Battle of Sekigahara. He was later awarded with more lucrative territories in western Japan, and replaced by Mizuno Tadakiyo from another branch of the clan based at Obata Domain in Kōzuke Province. In 1632, he was transferred to nearby Yoshida Domain, and was replaced by Matsudaira Tadafusa to 1647, followed by Matsudaira Sadamasa (from a different branch of the Matsudaira clan) to 1651. The domain was thereafter in the hands of the Inagaki clan, Abe clan, Honda clan, Miura clan and finally the Doi clan from 1734 until the Meiji restoration.

The next-to-last daimyō of Kariya Domain, Doi Toshiyoshi, despite holding several important posts within the administration of the Tokugawa shogunate, gave shelter to the rebels from the Tenchūgumi Incident and was forced to resign. His adopted son Doi Toshinori presided over a domain in a state of civil war between pro-shogunate and pro-sonnō jōi forces during the Boshin War and was unable to fulfill his assigned duty to hold Sumpu Castle for the shogunate. After the abolition of the han system in July 1871, the domain became “Kariya Prefecture”, which later became part of Aichi Prefecture.

Kariya Domain was not a single contiguous territory, but consisted of 22 villages in Hekikai District in Mikawa and 11 villages in Date District, Mutsu Province at the time of the Bakumatsu period.
The domain had a population of 19,850 people in 4927 households per the 1870 census. The domain maintained its primary residence (kamiyashiki) in Edo at Akasaka.

List of daimyō

References

External links
 Kariya Domain on "Edo 300 HTML"

Notes

Domains of Japan
1600 establishments in Japan
States and territories established in 1600
1871 disestablishments in Japan
States and territories disestablished in 1871
Mikawa Province
Domains of Aichi Prefecture